The 1864 Open Championship was the fifth Open Championship and was held on 16 September at Prestwick Golf Club. Tom Morris, Sr. won the championship for the third time, by two shots from Andrew Strath. There were sixteen competitors.

Morris had the first round lead with a score of 54. Willie Park, Sr. was a stroke behind with Willie Dow and Strath a further stroke behind. Morris kept his lead after the second round with a 58 for a total of 112 with Strath in second place on 113. Park got into the "Alps" bunker and took 10, finishing with a round of 67 and dropped out of contention. Morris had a final round of 55 for a total of 167 while Strath's 56 left him two shots behind.

In practice before the event Tom Morris, Sr. had accomplished the unprecedented feat of scoring 49 for a round.

Final leaderboard
Source:

Friday, 16 September 1864

The scores of the other competitors are not known. Other sources do not mention the fourth prize.

References

External links
Prestwick 1864 (Official site)

The Open Championship
Golf tournaments in Scotland
Open Championship
Open Championship
Open Championship